The Artists to Antarctica programme, also known as the Antarctica New Zealand Arts Fellowship and the Invited Artists Programme Antarctic Arts Fellows, was a community engagement programme run by Antarctica New Zealand, the government agency conducting New Zealand's activities in Antarctica.

From the 2014/15 season, this program was replaced by The Antarctica New Zealand Community Engagement Programme. 

Recipients of Antarctica New Zealand Arts Fellowship under the Artists to Antarctica Programme and the Invited Artists Programme include:

Also see:
 Antarctic Artists and Writers Program

References 

New Zealand literary awards
Arts organisations based in New Zealand